Hossein Emamian is an Iranian footballer.

Club career
Emamian has played with Naft Tehran since 2009.

Club career statistics

 Assists

References

Living people
Naft Tehran F.C. players
Iranian footballers
Nassaji Mazandaran players
Gol Gohar players
Rah Ahan players
Association football wingers
Year of birth missing (living people)